The Roman Catholic Diocese of Bafia is a diocese located in the city of Bafia in the Ecclesiastical province of Yaoundé in Cameroon.

History
 July 6, 1965: Established as Apostolic Prefecture of Bafia from the Metropolitan Archdiocese of Yaoundé
 January 11, 1968: Promoted as Diocese of Bafia

Ordinaries

Prefect Apostolic of Bafia (Roman rite)
 Father André Charles Lucien Loucheur(†), C.S.Sp. (July 14, 1965  – January 11, 1968 see below)

Bishops of Bafia (Roman rite)
 Bishop André Charles Lucien Loucheur(†), C.S.Sp. (see above January 11, 1968  – December 21, 1977)
 Bishop Athanase Bala(†), C.S.Sp. (December 21, 1977  – May 3, 2003)
 Bishop Jean-Marie Benoît Balla(†) (May 3, 2003  – May 31, 2017)
 Bishop Emmanuel Dassi Youfang, (Comm. l'Emm.) (May 13, 2020 -)

Coadjutor bishop
Athanase Bala(†), C.S.Sp. (1976-1977)

See also
Roman Catholicism in Cameroon

Sources
 catholic-hierarchy
 GCatholic.org

Roman Catholic dioceses in Cameroon
Christian organizations established in 1965
Roman Catholic dioceses and prelatures established in the 20th century
Roman Catholic Ecclesiastical Province of Yaoundé